Love Hard is the second album by American singer Alyssa Bonagura. Bonagura gained minor fame when her song "I Make My Own Sunshine" was featured in a Lowe's commercial in 2012, and is also the title-track of Chelsea Basham's debut album,  The album, her first major release, was released on October 30, 2012.

Track listing

References

External links

2012 albums